Bremen to Bridgwater is a double-CD live album by South African pianist and composer Chris McGregor's big band Brotherhood of Breath. It was recorded in 1971 and 1975 in Bremen, Germany, and Bridgwater, England, and was released on CD by Cuneiform Records in 2004.

Reception

In a review for AllMusic, William Tilland wrote: "fierce, joyous collective energy is a common denominator throughout. Music from all three concerts should cause not only the toes to tap but also the feet to stomp. On evidence of these recordings, the Brotherhood of Breath is a band that many listeners will still be happy to journey with for however long the journey takes."

Russell Carlson of JazzTimes stated that the album is "full of worthy jams... an intriguing history lesson," and commented: "I've come to call the band's sound 'African Dixieland'-guys blowing like mad with a rousing, uplifting spirit over driving, danceable beats."

Writing for All About Jazz, Rex Butters remarked: "Bremen to Bridgewater presents avant gardists who get funky and know their roots without giving up flight... The Brotherhood of Breath created a bracing mix of jazz styles, not just coexisting, but readily getting sweaty together." AAJ'''s Jerry D'Souza wrote: "What is exemplary is the way the course is charted for the musicians. The ensemble is tight and... there is the open vent for a soloist to slide into and to crag with some free enterprise... Each track fashions its own nugget."

In an article for the BBC, Peter Marsh stated: "This is glorious, joyous, fierce music, and a testament to the departed spirits of some of the most creative musicians you're likely to hear on record (or anywhere else). Absolutely essential."Dusted Magazine's Derek Taylor commented: "McGregor pilots each performance like a ship's captain self-assured of both his own talents and those of his mates. His premature death in 1990 to lung cancer seems all the more lamentable given the promise on display in these joyous performances."

Beppe Colli of Clocks and Clouds'' described the album as "indispensable," noting that it "presents different (and complementary) aspects of the group's history," and praising the "beautiful ensemble work" and "fine musical ideas."

Track listing
Disc 1
 "Funky Boots March" (Gary Windo, Nick Evans) – 3:06
 "Kongi's Theme" (Chris McGregor) – 11:12
 "Now" (Chris McGregor) – 14:08
 "The Bride" (Dudu Pukwana) – 7:32
 "Think of Something" (Mike Osborne) – 5:49
 "Union Special" (Chris McGregor) – 1:11
 "Andromeda" (Chris McGregor) – 4:09
 "Do It" (Chris McGregor) – 3:33
 "The Serpent's Kindly Eye" (Chris McGregor) – 19:26
 "Untitled Original" (Mike Osborne) – 9:21

Disc 2
 "Sonia" (Mongezi Feza) – 12:37
 "Now" (Chris McGregor) – 13:24
 "Yes, Please" (Radu Malfatti) – 11:19
 "Restless" (Chris McGregor) – 7:26
 "Kwhalo" (Dudu Pukwana) – 16:17
 "Untitled Original" (Chris McGregor) – 16:23

 Tracks 1–1 to 1–8 were recorded on June 20, 1971, at Lila Eule, Bremen, Germany. Tracks 1–9 to 1–10 were recorded on February 26, 1975, at the Bridgwater Arts Centre, Bridgwater, England. Tracks 2–1 to 2–6 were recorded on November 11, 1975, at the Bridgwater Arts Centre, Bridgwater, England.

Personnel 
 Chris McGregor – leader, piano
 Dudu Pukwana – alto saxophone
 Elton Dean – alto saxophone (disc 1, tracks 9–10; disc 2, tracks 1–6)
 Mike Osborne – alto saxophone, clarinet
 Bruce Grant – baritone saxophone (disc 2, tracks 1–6)
 Alan Skidmore – tenor saxophone (disc 1, tracks 1–10)
 Gary Windo – tenor saxophone (disc 1, tracks 1–8)
 Evan Parker – tenor saxophone, soprano saxophone (disc 2, tracks 1–6)
 Harry Beckett – trumpet
 Marc Charig – trumpet
 Mongezi Feza – trumpet
 Malcolm Griffiths – trombone (disc 1, tracks 1–10)
 Nick Evans – trombone
 Radu Malfatti – trombone (disc 2, tracks 1–6)
 Harry Miller – bass
 Louis Moholo – drums (disc 1, tracks 1–8; disc 2, tracks 1–6)
 Keith Bailey – drums (disc 1, tracks 9–10)

References

2004 live albums
Brotherhood of Breath live albums
Cuneiform Records live albums